Kirpalpur is a village in Tehsil Phagwara, Kapurthala district, in Punjab, India. The village is administrated by a Sarpanch, who is an elected representative of village.

Transport 
Phagwara Junction and Mauli Halt are the closest railway stations to Kirpalpur; Jalandhar City railway station is  distant.  The village is 118 km away from Sri Guru Ram Dass Jee International Airport in Amritsar and the nearest airport is Sahnewal Airport  in Ludhiana which is located 40 km away from the village.

References

External links
  Villages in Kapurthala
 Kapurthala Villages List

Villages in Kapurthala district